Bud Walton Arena (also known as the Basketball Palace of Mid-America) is the home to the men's and women's basketball teams of the University of Arkansas, known as the Razorbacks. It is located on the campus of the University of Arkansas in Fayetteville, Arkansas and has a seating capacity of 19,368, which is the fifth largest for an on-campus arena in the United States.

The arena features Bud Walton Arena Razorback Sports Museum on the ground level, which houses a history of Razorback basketball, track and field, baseball, tennis and golf.

Construction
The arena is named after James "Bud" Walton, co-founder of Walmart, who donated a large portion of the funds needed to build the arena. Walton purportedly gave $15 million, or around half of the construction cost. Construction of the arena took only 18 months, a short time considering the size of the undertaking.

When it was built, it was touted as a larger version of Barnhill Arena, the team's former home. In hopes of recreating the formidable home-court advantage the Razorbacks enjoyed at Barnhill, architect Rosser International built an arena that, as the company put it, had "more seats in less space than in any other facility of the same type anywhere in the world."

Early years
The arena has been the home to the Razorbacks since November 1993; the men's team won the national championship in the arena's first season of operation.  The basketball team's former home, Barnhill Arena was renovated into a volleyball-specific facility and now houses the Razorback women volleyball team.

In its early years, Nolan Richardson's teams frequently attracted standing-room-only crowds of over 20,000.

Improvements
Since its opening, there have been a number of enhancements and improvements to the arena. (There is also a LED ring at the top that is used to display game statistics.) In 2005, the locker rooms were remodeled, and a lounge and meeting area were added. 
Prior to the 2008–09 season, eight luxury suites were added, raising the total to 47. In addition, courtside seating was added, the student section was reconfigured, and press seating was moved to the east side of the arena behind the basket. In 2008, LED ribbon boards were installed around the ring between the upper and lower decks. The addition of these improvements expanded seating to 19,368.
Prior to the 2013-14 season, the press seating was moved to the southeast corner of the bottom bowl, with its prior location being used for an expanded student section.

Nolan Richardson Court
On February 6, 2018, the University of Arkansas’ Associated Student Government Senate passed a resolution by Senator Clay Smith to encourage the University of Arkansas Athletic Department to name the court at the arena in honor of former Arkansas head coach Nolan Richardson. 

On March 28, 2019, the University of Arkansas Board of Trustees voted unanimously to name the court in honor of former coach Richardson.

Statistics of Bud Walton Arena

Attendance Record: 20,361 vs. Auburn, February 8, 2022.

Attendance Chart (men) for every year Bud Walton Arena has been in operation

See also
 List of NCAA Division I basketball arenas

References

External links
Bud Walton Arena - Arkansas Razorbacks
Google Maps Satellite/Map of Bud Walton Arena
Bud Walton Arena overview at LadyBacks.com (official site of Arkansas women's athletics)
FayettevilleTourism.com information on Bud Walton Arena
RateItAll.com Rating of Bud Walton Arena

University of Arkansas buildings
Arkansas Razorbacks basketball venues
Basketball venues in Arkansas
College basketball venues in the United States
Indoor arenas in Arkansas
Tourist attractions in Fayetteville, Arkansas
Museums in Washington County, Arkansas
Sports museums in Arkansas
1993 establishments in Arkansas
Sports venues completed in 1993
University and college buildings completed in 1993